Epitoxis namaqua is a moth of the  subfamily Arctiinae. It is found in South Africa.

References

 Natural History Museum Lepidoptera generic names catalog

Arctiinae
Moths described in 2011